The 1903 VFL season was the seventh season of the Victorian Football League (VFL), the highest level senior Australian rules football competition in Victoria. The season featured eight clubs, ran from 2 May until 12 September, and comprised a 17-game home-and-away season followed by a finals series featuring the top four clubs.

The premiership was won by the Collingwood Football Club for the second time and second time consecutively, after it defeated  by two points in the 1903 VFL Grand Final.

Premiership season
In 1903, the VFL competition consisted of eight teams of 18 on-the-field players each, with no "reserves", although any of the 18 players who had left the playing field for any reason could later resume their place on the field at any time during the match.

Each team played each other twice in a home-and-away season of 14 rounds. Then, based on ladder positions after those 14 rounds, three further 'sectional rounds' were played, with the teams ranked 1st, 3rd, 5th and 7th playing in one section and the teams ranked 2nd, 4th, 6th and 8th playing in the other. 

Once the 17 round home-and-away season had finished, the 1903 VFL Premiers were determined by the specific format and conventions of the amended "Argus system".

Round 1

|- bgcolor="#CCCCFF"
| Home team
| Home team score
| Away team
| Away team score
| Venue
| Date
|- bgcolor="#FFFFFF"
| 
| 3.3 (21)
| 
| 11.7 (73)
| East Melbourne Cricket Ground
| 2 May 1903
|- bgcolor="#FFFFFF"
| 
| 9.4 (58)
| 
| 5.7 (37)
| Princes Park
| 2 May 1903
|- bgcolor="#FFFFFF"
| 
| 6.14 (50)
| 
| 5.13 (43)
| Lake Oval
| 2 May 1903
|- bgcolor="#FFFFFF"
| 
| 2.8 (20)
| 
| 9.18 (72)
| Junction Oval
| 2 May 1903

Round 2

|- bgcolor="#CCCCFF"
| Home team
| Home team score
| Away team
| Away team score
| Venue
| Date
|- bgcolor="#FFFFFF"
| 
| 13.14 (92)
| 
| 3.6 (24)
| Victoria Park
| 9 May 1903
|- bgcolor="#FFFFFF"
| 
| 4.5 (29)
| 
| 6.11 (47)
| MCG
| 9 May 1903
|- bgcolor="#FFFFFF"
| 
| 3.12 (30)
| 
| 4.6 (30)
| Junction Oval
| 9 May 1903
|- bgcolor="#FFFFFF"
| 
| 8.7 (55)
| 
| 6.9 (45)
| SCG
| 3 August 1903

The match between Geelong and Carlton, originally to have been played at Corio Oval, was postponed due to a railway strike. It was played between Rounds 13 and 14, and was opportunistically moved to the Sydney Cricket Ground.

Round 3

|- bgcolor="#CCCCFF"
| Home team
| Home team score
| Away team
| Away team score
| Venue
| Date
|- bgcolor="#FFFFFF"
| 
| 15.10 (100)
| 
| 4.8 (32)
| Corio Oval
| 16 May 1903
|- bgcolor="#FFFFFF"
| 
| 12.17 (89)
| 
| 3.4 (22)
| Brunswick Street Oval
| 16 May 1903
|- bgcolor="#FFFFFF"
| 
| 16.17 (113)
| 
| 5.3 (33)
| Victoria Park
| 16 May 1903
|- bgcolor="#FFFFFF"
| 
| 5.5 (35)
| 
| 7.14 (56)
| East Melbourne Cricket Ground
| 16 May 1903

Round 4

|- bgcolor="#CCCCFF"
| Home team
| Home team score
| Away team
| Away team score
| Venue
| Date
|- bgcolor="#FFFFFF"
| 
| 12.16 (88)
| 
| 1.4 (10)
| Princes Park
| 23 May 1903
|- bgcolor="#FFFFFF"
| 
| 5.7 (37)
| 
| 6.11 (47)
| Lake Oval
| 23 May 1903
|- bgcolor="#FFFFFF"
| 
| 3.7 (25)
| 
| 4.4 (28)
| MCG
| 23 May 1903
|- bgcolor="#FFFFFF"
| 
| 7.20 (62)
| 
| 6.9 (45)
| SCG
| 23 May 1903

Round 5

|- bgcolor="#CCCCFF"
| Home team
| Home team score
| Away team
| Away team score
| Venue
| Date
|- bgcolor="#FFFFFF"
| 
| 13.17 (95)
| 
| 3.10 (28)
| Brunswick Street Oval
| 30 May 1903
|- bgcolor="#FFFFFF"
| 
| 10.13 (73)
| 
| 5.10 (40)
| East Melbourne Cricket Ground
| 30 May 1903
|- bgcolor="#FFFFFF"
| 
| 10.17 (77)
| 
| 7.4 (46)
| Victoria Park
| 30 May 1903
|- bgcolor="#FFFFFF"
| 
| 5.4 (34)
| 
| 10.7 (67)
| Lake Oval
| 30 May 1903

Round 6

|- bgcolor="#CCCCFF"
| Home team
| Home team score
| Away team
| Away team score
| Venue
| Date
|- bgcolor="#FFFFFF"
| 
| 5.11 (41)
| 
| 6.12 (48)
| East Melbourne Cricket Ground
| 6 June 1903
|- bgcolor="#FFFFFF"
| 
| 8.8 (56)
| 
| 4.5 (29)
| Princes Park
| 6 June 1903
|- bgcolor="#FFFFFF"
| 
| 8.9 (57)
| 
| 2.15 (27)
| Junction Oval
| 6 June 1903
|- bgcolor="#FFFFFF"
| 
| 8.3 (51)
| 
| 12.12 (84)
| Corio Oval
| 6 June 1903

Round 7

|- bgcolor="#CCCCFF"
| Home team
| Home team score
| Away team
| Away team score
| Venue
| Date
|- bgcolor="#FFFFFF"
| 
| 8.14 (62)
| 
| 3.4 (22)
| Brunswick Street Oval
| 8 June 1903
|- bgcolor="#FFFFFF"
| 
| 4.9 (33)
| 
| 2.13 (25)
| Victoria Park
| 8 June 1903
|- bgcolor="#FFFFFF"
| 
| 5.8 (38)
| 
| 6.11 (47)
| Lake Oval
| 8 June 1903
|- bgcolor="#FFFFFF"
| 
| 4.8 (32)
| 
| 1.2 (8)
| MCG
| 8 June 1903

Round 8

|- bgcolor="#CCCCFF"
| Home team
| Home team score
| Away team
| Away team score
| Venue
| Date
|- bgcolor="#FFFFFF"
| 
| 6.6 (42)
| 
| 3.17 (35)
| MCG
| 13 June 1903
|- bgcolor="#FFFFFF"
| 
| 5.9 (39)
| 
| 7.13 (55)
| Corio Oval
| 13 June 1903
|- bgcolor="#FFFFFF"
| 
| 8.6 (54)
| 
| 3.11 (29)
| Brunswick Street Oval
| 13 June 1903
|- bgcolor="#FFFFFF"
| 
| 12.9 (81)
| 
| 10.7 (67)
| Victoria Park
| 13 June 1903

Round 9

|- bgcolor="#CCCCFF"
| Home team
| Home team score
| Away team
| Away team score
| Venue
| Date
|- bgcolor="#FFFFFF"
| 
| 4.10 (34)
| 
| 3.8 (26)
| Brunswick Street Oval
| 20 June 1903
|- bgcolor="#FFFFFF"
| 
| 4.8 (32)
| 
| 4.5 (29)
| East Melbourne Cricket Ground
| 20 June 1903
|- bgcolor="#FFFFFF"
| 
| 8.6 (54)
| 
| 6.11 (47)
| Princes Park
| 20 June 1903
|- bgcolor="#FFFFFF"
| 
| 4.11 (35)
| 
| 6.6 (42)
| Lake Oval
| 20 June 1903

Round 10

|- bgcolor="#CCCCFF"
| Home team
| Home team score
| Away team
| Away team score
| Venue
| Date
|- bgcolor="#FFFFFF"
| 
| 6.14 (50)
| 
| 2.2 (14)
| Princes Park
| 4 July 1903
|- bgcolor="#FFFFFF"
| 
| 5.9 (39)
| 
| 10.7 (67)
| MCG
| 4 July 1903
|- bgcolor="#FFFFFF"
| 
| 5.7 (37)
| 
| 7.11 (53)
| Lake Oval
| 4 July 1903
|- bgcolor="#FFFFFF"
| 
| 2.4 (16)
| 
| 5.11 (41)
| Junction Oval
| 4 July 1903

Round 11

|- bgcolor="#CCCCFF"
| Home team
| Home team score
| Away team
| Away team score
| Venue
| Date
|- bgcolor="#FFFFFF"
| 
| 9.13 (67)
| 
| 3.12 (30)
| Corio Oval
| 11 July 1903
|- bgcolor="#FFFFFF"
| 
| 3.16 (34)
| 
| 4.5 (29)
| East Melbourne Cricket Ground
| 11 July 1903
|- bgcolor="#FFFFFF"
| 
| 8.8 (56)
| 
| 5.6 (36)
| Victoria Park
| 11 July 1903
|- bgcolor="#FFFFFF"
| 
| 4.3 (27)
| 
| 8.14 (62)
| Junction Oval
| 11 July 1903

Round 12

|- bgcolor="#CCCCFF"
| Home team
| Home team score
| Away team
| Away team score
| Venue
| Date
|- bgcolor="#FFFFFF"
| 
| 7.8 (50)
| 
| 2.8 (20)
| Princes Park
| 18 July 1903
|- bgcolor="#FFFFFF"
| 
| 5.11 (41)
| 
| 5.8 (38)
| Junction Oval
| 18 July 1903
|- bgcolor="#FFFFFF"
| 
| 13.11 (89)
| 
| 6.8 (44)
| Corio Oval
| 18 July 1903
|- bgcolor="#FFFFFF"
| 
| 4.8 (32)
| 
| 11.8 (74)
| MCG
| 18 July 1903

Round 13

|- bgcolor="#CCCCFF"
| Home team
| Home team score
| Away team
| Away team score
| Venue
| Date
|- bgcolor="#FFFFFF"
| 
| 4.8 (32)
| 
| 9.7 (61)
| MCG
| 25 July 1903
|- bgcolor="#FFFFFF"
| 
| 6.15 (51)
| 
| 5.7 (37)
| Victoria Park
| 25 July 1903
|- bgcolor="#FFFFFF"
| 
| 5.7 (37)
| 
| 7.17 (59)
| Lake Oval
| 25 July 1903
|- bgcolor="#FFFFFF"
| 
| 8.8 (56)
| 
| 3.6 (24)
| Brunswick Street Oval
| 25 July 1903

Round 14

|- bgcolor="#CCCCFF"
| Home team
| Home team score
| Away team
| Away team score
| Venue
| Date
|- bgcolor="#FFFFFF"
| 
| 5.11 (41)
| 
| 8.8 (56)
| Princes Park
| 8 August 1903
|- bgcolor="#FFFFFF"
| 
| 7.4 (46)
| 
| 11.7 (73)
| East Melbourne Cricket Ground
| 8 August 1903
|- bgcolor="#FFFFFF"
| 
| 5.3 (33)
| 
| 9.12 (66)
| Corio Oval
| 8 August 1903
|- bgcolor="#FFFFFF"
| 
| 12.9 (81)
| 
| 4.8 (32)
| Junction Oval
| 8 August 1903

Sectional Rounds

Sectional Round 1 (Round 15)

|- bgcolor="#CCCCFF"
| Home team
| Home team score
| Away team
| Away team score
| Venue
| Date
|- bgcolor="#FFFFFF"
| 
| 5.2 (32)
| 
| 9.13 (67)
| MCG
| 15 August 1903
|- bgcolor="#FFFFFF"
| 
| 3.12 (30)
| 
| 2.6 (18)
| Victoria Park
| 15 August 1903
|- bgcolor="#FFFFFF"
| 
| 8.7 (55)
| 
| 10.14 (74)
| East Melbourne Cricket Ground
| 15 August 1903
|- bgcolor="#FFFFFF"
| 
| 8.8 (56)
| 
| 12.14 (86)
| Lake Oval
| 15 August 1903

Sectional Round 2 (Round 16)

|- bgcolor="#CCCCFF"
| Home team
| Home team score
| Away team
| Away team score
| Venue
| Date
|- bgcolor="#FFFFFF"
| 
| 5.11 (41)
| 
| 6.7 (43)
| Princes Park
| 22 August 1903
|- bgcolor="#FFFFFF"
| 
| 15.12 (102)
| 
| 4.7 (31)
| Corio Oval
| 22 August 1903
|- bgcolor="#FFFFFF"
| 
| 11.17 (83)
| 
| 3.5 (23)
| Brunswick Street Oval
| 22 August 1903
|- bgcolor="#FFFFFF"
| 
| 7.12 (54)
| 
| 4.7 (31)
| Junction Oval
| 22 August 1903

Sectional Round 3 (Round 17)

|- bgcolor="#CCCCFF"
| Home team
| Home team score
| Away team
| Away team score
| Venue
| Date
|- bgcolor="#FFFFFF"
| 
| 3.10 (28)
| 
| 4.7 (31)
| Junction Oval
| 29 August 1903
|- bgcolor="#FFFFFF"
| 
| 13.13 (91)
| 
| 5.10 (40)
| Victoria Park
| 29 August 1903
|- bgcolor="#FFFFFF"
| 
| 14.10 (94)
| 
| 5.7 (37)
| East Melbourne Cricket Ground
| 29 August 1903
|- bgcolor="#FFFFFF"
| 
| 3.9 (27)
| 
| 5.4 (34)
| Corio Oval
| 29 August 1903

Ladder

Semi finals

First Semi Final

|- bgcolor="#CCCCFF"
| Home team
| Home team score
| Away team
| Away team score
| Venue
| Date
| Attendance
|- bgcolor="#FFFFFF"
| 
| 11.15 (81)
| 
| 4.5 (29)
| MCG
| 5 September 1903
| 15,000
|- bgcolor="#FFFFFF"

Second Semi Final

|- bgcolor="#CCCCFF"
| Home team
| Home team score
| Away team
| Away team score
| Venue
| Date
| Attendance
|- bgcolor="#FFFFFF"
| 
| 4.3 (27)
| 
| 3.5 (23)
| Brunswick Street Oval
| 5 September 1903
| 16,600
|- bgcolor="#FFFFFF"

Grand final

Collingwood defeated Fitzroy 4.7 (31) to 3.11 (29). (For an explanation of scoring see Australian rules football).

Awards
 The 1903 VFL Premiership team was Collingwood.
 The VFL's leading goalkicker was Teddy Lockwood of Collingwood with 35 goals.
 South Melbourne took the "wooden spoon" in 1903.

Notable events
 Boundary umpires were added to some VFL matches, relieving the field umpire of the task of returning the ball to play from the boundary, and would be made permanent from 1904.
 Following their Round 1 loss to Geelong, St Kilda had played 100 VFL games for a record of two wins and 98 losses.
 The Round 2 match between Geelong and Carlton on 9 May was postponed after a railway strike on the afternoon of 8 May prevented the Carlton team from getting to Geelong. The league decided to use the opportunity to promote the game in Sydney, and arranged to play the match on Saturday, 1 August at the Sydney Cricket Ground, but due to heavy rain, the match was postponed  to Monday, 3 August before a crowd of 5,000; Geelong won 8.7 (55) to 6.9 (45). In Round 3, Melbourne had to travel to Geelong by boat as the strike still had not been resolved.
 On 23 May, a crowd of 18,000 attended the round 4 match between Fitzroy and Collingwood at the Sydney Cricket Ground; Fitzroy won 7.20 (62) to 6.9 (45). Players wore large numbers on the back of their guernseys to assist the crowd.
 St Kilda's win over South Melbourne in Round 7 was its first away win in 54 VFL matches; the 53 consecutive away losses is an AFL/VFL record. It was also St Kilda's first senior away win since defeating Port Melbourne in 1894, after 77 consecutive winless away matches (including three draws) and 62 consecutive away losses.
 1903 was the first time that the VFL Premiership was decided on the last kick of the day. The usually accurate Fitzroy captain Gerald Brosnan missed the goal from 30 metres out, and Fitzroy lost to Collingwood by two points.

References

 Ross, J. (ed), 100 Years of Australian Football 1897–1996: The Complete Story of the AFL, All the Big Stories, All the Great Pictures, All the Champions, Every AFL Season Reported, Viking, (Ringwood), 1996.

External links
 1903 Season - AFL Tables

Australian Football League seasons
VFL season